Onegai may refer to:

 Onegai Teacher, a 2002 Japanese anime series 
 Onegai Twins, a 2003 Japanese anime series
 Onegai Monster, a strategy game for the Nintendo 64
 Onegai My Melody, a 2008 Japanese Magical Girl anime series